This is a list of dāstāns and qissas (prose fiction) written in Urdu during the 18th and 19th centuries. The skeleton of the list is a reproduction of the list provided by Gyan Chand Jain in his study entitled Urdū kī nasrī dāstānen.

18th- and 19th-century Urdu dastans and qissas 
 Nau tarz-i murassa''' - Husain ‘Atā Khān Tahsīn
 Nau ā'īn-i hindī (Qissa-i Malik Mahmūd Gīti-Afroz) - Mihr Chand Khatrī
 Jazb-i ‘ishq - Shāh Husain Haqīqat
 Nau tarz-i murassa‘ - Muhammad Hādī a.k.a. Mirzā Mughal Ghāfil
 Ārā'ish-i mahfil (Qissa-i Hātim Tā'ī) - Haidar Bakhsh Haidarī
 Bāgh o Bahār (Qissa-i Chahār Darwesh) - Mīr Amman
 Dāstān-i Amīr Hamza - Khalīl ‘Alī Khān Ashk
 Fasana ajaeeb'' - Rajab Ali Baig Suroor

See also 
Urdu literature
Dastangoi
Dastan

References

Literature lists

Urdu
Indian literature-related lists
Pakistan-related lists
List
Pakistani literature